Minyo Crusaders is a Japanese musical group that reworks traditional Japanese folk songs (min'yō) with arrangements inspired by various international music genres, including Caribbean, Latin and African music. The group was co-founded by Katsumi Tanaka and Freddie Tsukamoto, with the goal of reviving min'yō as a "music for the people".

They released their first album, Echoes of Japan in 2017 on P-Vine Records. The album was later reissued on Mais Um in 2019.

Discography

Studio albums

EPs

References 

Japanese musical groups
World music groups